Werkwuha Getachew (born 7 December 1995) is an Ethiopian athlete who specialises in the 3000 metres steeplechase. She won the silver medal in the event at the 2022 World Championships and a gold at the 2022 African Championships.

Getachew holds Ethiopian national records in the 800 metres and 3000 m steeplechase. As of September 2022, she placed fourth at the latter event on the world all-time list. She was at her specialist event 2022 Diamond League champion.

In June 2021 at the Fanny Blankers-Koen Stadium in Hengelo at the Ethiopian Olympic trial event, Werkwuha Getachew caused a sensation in the women’s 800m as she lowered her 2:00.20 PB to a world lead of 1:56.67 and set a new national record. She became the first woman in the world to break 1:57 in 2021 and secured her spot at the delayed 2020 Tokyo Olympics. Despite being named in official documentation and travelling to Tokyo, Getachew was pulled out the day of the women’s 800m heats and did not participate.

Achievements

International competitions

Personal bests
 800 metres – 1:56.67 (Hengelo 2021) 
 1500 metres – 4:10.0h (Addis Ababa 2021)
 3000 metres indoor – 8:37.98 (Karlsruhe 2023)
 3000 metres steeplechase – 8:54.61 (Eugene, OR 2022)

Circuit wins and titles, National championships
 Diamond League champion 3000 m steeplechase:  2022
 2022 (3000 m st.): Monaco Herculis, Zürich Weltklasse
 Ethiopian Athletics Championships
 800 metres: 2021
 3000 metres steeplechase: 2022

References

External links
 

Living people
1995 births
Ethiopian female middle-distance runners
African Championships in Athletics winners
20th-century Ethiopian women
21st-century Ethiopian women